Gorichane is a village in Shabla Municipality, Dobrich Province, northeastern Bulgaria.

Honours
Gorichane Glacier on Brabant Island, Antarctica is named after the village.

References

Villages in Dobrich Province